The 2012 Missouri elections took place on November 6, 2012.

Presidential

United States Senate 

Incumbent Claire McCaskill won by a considerably large margin even as Barack Obama lost the state to Mitt Romney.

United States House of Representatives

Governor 

Even as Barack Obama lost the state to Mitt Romney, Incumbent Governor Jay Nixon won re-election by 10 points

Lieutenant Governor

Secretary of State

State Treasurer

Attorney General

References 

 
Missouri